The 14221 / 22 Faizabad Junction–Kanpur Anwarganj Intercity Express is an Intercity Express  train belonging to Indian Railways Northern Railway zone that runs between  and  in India.

Coaches
The 14221 / 22 Faizabad Junction–Kanpur Anwarganj Intercity Express has eight general unreserved & two SLR (seating with luggage rake) coaches . It does not carry a pantry car coach.

As is customary with most train services in India, coach composition may be amended at the discretion of Indian Railways depending on demand.

Service

Routing

Traction
As the route is not electrified, a   based WDM-3A diesel locomotive pulls the train to its destination.

References

External links
14221 Intercity Express at India Rail Info
14222 Intercity Express at India Rail Info

Intercity Express (Indian Railways) trains
Trains from Kanpur
Trains from Faizabad